San Bartolomé de la Torre is a town and municipality located in the province of Huelva, Spain. According to the 2008 census, the municipality had a population of 3446 inhabitants.

References

Municipalities in the Province of Huelva